Calochilus paludosus, commonly known as the red beard orchid or red beardie, is a species of orchid native to Australia and New Zealand. It has a single fleshy, light green leaf and up to nine greenish flowers with reddish stripes. The labellum has a dull red or coppery coloured beard and lacks the "eye" spots of other beard orchids.

Description
Unlike some others in the genus, the leaf is fully developed at flowering time. The column lacks the sham "eyes" of most other beard orchids. Flowering occurs from September to January.

Taxonomy and naming
Calochilus paludosus was first formally described in 1810 by Robert Brown and the description was published in Prodromus Florae Novae Hollandiae. The specific epithet (paludosus) is a Latin word meaning "boggy" or "marshy".

Distribution and habitat
The red beard orchid is widespread in eastern Australia where it grows in heath and open forest, often in wet places but also in drier open forest. It is found in Queensland south from Burleigh Heads, in mostly coastal districts of New South Wales, mostly in the higher rainfall areas of Victoria and in Tasmania but is only known from a single population in South Australia. In New Zealand, C. paludosus occurs in the North Island, often near geothermally active ground, and the northern part of the South Island.

References

paludosus
Orchids of Australia
Orchids of New Zealand
Plants described in 1810
Taxa named by Robert Brown (botanist, born 1773)